Kuhgrat (or Kuegrat) is the highest of a group of three peaks known as the Drei Schwestern which between them form part of the Austria-Liechtenstein border.

References
 

Mountains of Liechtenstein
Austria–Liechtenstein border
International mountains of Europe
Mountains of the Alps